Tomáš Vondrášek (born 26 October 1987) is a Czech football striker currently playing for FK Teplice in the Czech Republic.

References

 
 Guardian Football

1987 births
Living people
Czech footballers
Czech First League players
FK Teplice players
FK Ústí nad Labem players
FK Baník Sokolov players
Association football forwards